Vazgen Sargsyan House-Museum is a house-museum located in the Ararat village of Ararat Province, Armenia. It was opened in 2001 and located on Garegin Nzhdeh street. The museum is dedicated to the former Prime Minister of Armenia Vazgen Sargsyan.

Gallery

References 

Museums established in 2001
Museums in Armenia
Ararat Province